Organic computing is computing that behaves and interacts with humans in an organic manner. The term "organic" is used to describe the system's behavior, and does not imply that they are constructed from organic materials. It is based on the insight that we will soon be surrounded by large collections of autonomous systems, which are equipped with sensors and actuators, aware of their environment, communicate freely, and organize themselves in order to perform the actions and services that seem to be required.

The goal is to construct such systems as robust, safe, flexible, and trustworthy as possible. In particular, a strong orientation towards human needs as opposed to a pure implementation of the technologically possible seems absolutely central. In order to achieve these goals, our technical systems will have to act more independently, flexibly, and autonomously, i.e. they will have to exhibit lifelike properties. We call such systems "organic". Hence, an "Organic Computing System" is a technical system which adapts dynamically to exogenous and endogenous change. It is characterized by the properties of self-organization, self-configuration, self-optimization, self-healing, self-protection, self-explaining, and context awareness. It can be seen as an extension of the Autonomic computing vision of IBM.

In a variety of research projects the priority research program SPP 1183 of the German Research Foundation (DFG) addresses fundamental challenges in the design of Organic Computing systems; its objective is a deeper understanding of emergent global behavior in self-organizing systems and the design of specific concepts and tools to support the construction of Organic Computing systems for technical applications.

See also
Biologically inspired computing
Autonomic computing

References

 Müller-Schloer, Christian; v.d. Malsburg, Christoph and Würtz, Rolf P. Organic Computing. Aktuelles Schlagwort in Informatik Spektrum (2004) pp. 332–336.
 Müller-Schloer, Christian. Organic Computing – On the Feasibility of Controlled Emergence. CODES + ISSS 2004 Proceedings (2004) pp 2–5, ACM Press, . 
 Rochner, Fabian and Müller-Schloer, Christian. Emergence in Technical Systems. it Special Issue on Organic Computing (2005) pp. 188–200, Oldenbourg Verlag, Jahrgang 47, ISSN 1611-2776.
 Schmeck, Hartmut. Organic Computing – A New Vision for Distributed Embedded Systems. Proceedings of the Eighth IEEE International Symposium on Object-Oriented Real-Time Distributed Computing (ISORC’05) (2005) pp. 201–203, IEEE, IEEE Computer Society 2005.
 Würtz, Rolf P. (Editor): Organic Computing (Understanding Complex Systems). Springer, 2008. .

External links
 DFG SPP 1183 Organic Computing
 Position Paper Organic Computing (German)
 Self-Organising Systems (SOS) FAQ
 The Organic Computing Page
 The PUPS/P3 Organic Computing Environment for Linux (Free Software)
 SeSAm Multiagent simulator and graphical modelling environment. (Free Software)

Programming paradigms